Bi Xiaoliang (born 26 December 1992) is a Chinese track and field athlete who competes in the high jump.

Born in Shandong, Bi began taking part in athletics as a teenager and began to compete at national leve in 2010. He participated at the Chinese Athletics Championships that year and made the final round the next season, placing 15th overall. He came eighth at the Chinese junior championships and the Chinese City Games in 2011.

Bi had his breakthrough year in 2013. He cleared  at three successive meetings on the Chinese Athletics Grand Prix circuit and came sixth at the Chinese Championships. In the absence of defending champion Mutaz Essa Barshim and in poor weather conditions, he won the gold medal at the 2013 Asian Athletics Championships by virtue of a jump-off. This earned him a place at the 2013 World Championships in Athletics, but he failed to register a valid mark.

References

External links

Living people
1992 births
Chinese male high jumpers
Athletes from Shandong
21st-century Chinese people